Crackenthorpe is a civil parish in the Eden District, Cumbria, England. It contains six buildings that are recorded in the National Heritage List for England. Of these, one is listed at Grade II*, the middle of the three grades, and the others are at Grade II, the lowest grade.  The parish contains the village of Crackenthorpe and the surrounding countryside.  The listed buildings comprise a country house, four associated structures, and a milestone.


Key

Buildings

Notes and references

Notes

Citations

Sources

Lists of listed buildings in Cumbria